Lirapex humatus is a species of sea snail, a marine gastropod mollusk in the family Peltospiridae.

Description

Distribution
This marine species occurs on the East Pacific Rise.
 Warén A. & Bouchet P. (2001). Gastropoda and Monoplacophora from hydrothermal vents and seeps new taxa and records. The Veliger, 44(2): 116-231

References

External links
 Warén A. & Bouchet P. (1989). New gastropods from East Pacific hydrothermal vents. Zoologica Scripta. 18(1): 67-102
 

Peltospiridae
Gastropods described in 2001